Thomas Augustine Judge (August 23, 1868November 23, 1933) was an American Catholic priest who is most notable for founding the Missionary Servants of the Most Holy Trinity on April 11, 1909.

Biography

Early life 
Judge was born as the fifth of eight children in South Boston on August 23, 1868, to Irish immigrants Thomas Judge Sr, who was a laborer and painter, and Mary Donahue. Due to there being no parochial school for him to attend, Judge would enroll into the John A. Andrew Public School in September 1876. On May 3, 1887, his father unexpectedly died which made Judge work multiple jobs, having to finish his high school education by attending night classes. On January 25, 1890, he entered St. Vincent's Seminary in Germantown and became a member of the Congregation of the Mission in 1895. He then studied philosophy and theology at the St. Vincent's Seminary from 1894 to 1899. Along with two of his younger sisters, he entered the Daughters of Charity of Saint Vincent de Paul in 1899.

Missionary Servants of the Most Holy Trinity 

On April 11, 1899, in Brooklyn, along with five women he would begin the Missionary Servants of the Most Holy Trinity.

Death 
Judge died of an illness on November 23, 1933, at 2:00 am Pacific time (10:00 UTC). His body was at first transferred to the Blessed Trinity Missionary Cenacle the following day, and was buried at the Holy Sepulchre Cemetery six days after his death.

Legacy 
The Father Judge High School is named after him.

References 

1868 births
1933 deaths
19th-century American Roman Catholic priests
20th-century American Roman Catholic priests
People from South Boston
American Roman Catholic missionaries
American Roman Catholic clergy of Irish descent